Microbiofuels are biofuels produced by microorganisms like bacteria, cyanobacteria, microalgae, fungi, etc. The term was first defined by Asen Nenov at TEDxBG event on 9 January, 2010.

 Microbiofuels use biotechnologies for biofuel production;
 Microbiofuels technology implements production methods based microbiorefineries, i.e. micro-organisms placed in a specific environment;
 Microbiofuel technology could be used for recycling industrial waste, including gaseous waste such as carbon dioxide and nitrogen oxide, and for producing valuable biofuels by biotransformation.

References 

Biomass
 
Bioenergy
Sustainable technologies
Microorganisms and humans
Algae biofuels
Algal fuel producers